Gudivada Gurunadha Rao (4 May 1955  22 November 2001) was an Indian politician and social activist who belonged to Indian National Congress. He was the Member of parliament who represented Anakapalli Lok Sabha constituency of Andhra Pradesh from 1998 to 1999 and Andhra Pradesh Legislative Assembly member from 1989 to 1994.

Life and background
Rao was born on 4 May 1955 in Mindi village of Visakhapatnam city of Andhra Pradesh. He was a political and social worker. During his education span, he passed secondary examination from a nearby school and then moved to Hindustan Shipyard Degree College, Visakhapatnam for further studies. He was actively participating in events and was organising the events for school children.

Career 
Rao has served as the Legislative Assembly member for Andhra Pradesh from 1989 to 1994 and minister of Technical Education from 1994 to 1998 in the state of Andhra Pradesh which was his hometown. In 1998, he was elected the member of parliament during the 12th General elections of India. It was 1998 when he served as a member at Committee on Commerce, Consultative Committee, and minister of Science and Technology till 1998.

Personal life
Rao was born to Appanna Rao and at the age of 25, he married Nagamani on 23 August 1981. He had one daughter and one son. His wife is a politician. His son, Gudivada Amarnath, is also a politician and is elected as the Member of the Legislative Assembly from Anakapalle Assembly constituency.

Death
Rao was 46 when he suffered end-stage kidney disease and died on 22 November 2001 at Hyderabad, Andhra Pradesh.

References 

1955 births
India MPs 1998–1999
2001 deaths
19th-century Indian politicians
People from Hyderabad, India
People from Visakhapatnam district
Indian National Congress politicians from Andhra Pradesh
Andhra Pradesh MLAs 1989–1994
State cabinet ministers of Andhra Pradesh